The Swedish Antarctic Expedition of 1901–1903 was a scientific expedition led by Otto Nordenskjöld and Carl Anton Larsen. It was the first Swedish endeavour to Antarctica in the Heroic Age of Antarctic Exploration.

Background 
Otto Nordenskjöld, a Swedish geologist and geographer, organized and led a scientific expedition of the Antarctic Peninsula. Seven other scientists, including archaeologist Johan Gunnar Andersson, botanist Carl Skottsberg, and zoologist Axel Ohlin, along with 16 officers and men joined them on the voyage. On 16 October 1901, the Antarctic left the Port of Gothenburg.

Events 
Despite its end and the great hardships endured, the expedition would be considered a scientific success, with the parties having explored much of the eastern coast of Graham Land, including Cape Longing, James Ross Island, the Joinville Island group, and the Palmer Archipelago. The expedition, which also recovered valuable geological samples and samples of marine animals, earned Nordenskjöld lasting fame at home, but its huge cost left him greatly in debt.

Two key Antarctic islands are associated with the expedition: Snow Hill Island, where Nordenskjöld and five of his colleagues spent two winters—one of them planned and the second forced by the sinking of the Antarctic—and Paulet Island, where the crew of the Antarctic were stranded from February until November 1903. The expedition was rescued by the Argentinian naval vessel Uruguay.

Snow Hill Island 
On the way to Snow Hill Island in 1901, Nordenskjöld had passed through Buenos Aires, where the Argentine government gave him supplies and other assistance on the condition that he include in his wintering-over party a young Argentine naval officer, Lieutenant José María Sobral. The American artist Frank Wilbert Stokes also joined the expedition and spent two years with Nordenskjöld at Snow Hill Island. In 1903, the Argentine government organized a rescue effort with the corvette , which successfully brought back all the surviving members of the Nordenskjöld party.

Paulet Island 

Apart from the limited supplies they brought from the Antarctic, they survived on the thousand or so penguins they killed, as well as the birds' eggs.

See also 
 List of Antarctic expeditions

References

Footnotes

Bibliography 
 Antarctica. Sydney: Reader's Digest, 1985, pp. 152–159.
 Child, Jack. Antarctica and South American Geopolitics: Frozen Lebensraum. New York: Praeger Publishers, 1988, pp. 69, 72.
 Stewart, Andrew, Antarctica: An Encyclopedia. London: McFarland and Co., 1990 (2 volumes).
 Nordenskiöld, Otto, Antarctica: or, Two years amongst the ice of the South Pole (Macmillan. 1905)
 U.S. National Science Foundation, Geographic Names of the Antarctic, Fred G. Alberts, ed. Washington: NSF, 1980.

External links 
 Antarctic Swedish Antarctic Expedition 1901–1903
 Nordenskjöld's Antarctic Expedition
 Map of the area explored by the expedition
 2002 revisit the sites of the 1902 Expedition

1901 in Antarctica
1902 in Antarctica
1903 in Antarctica
Antarctic expeditions
Expeditions from Sweden
Heroic Age of Antarctic Exploration
Sweden and the Antarctic